Cryptophorellia madagascariensis is a species of tephritid or fruit flies in the genus Cryptophorellia of the family Tephritidae.

Distribution
Madagascar.

References

Tephritinae
Insects described in 1989
Diptera of Africa